Cyperus pannonicus is a species of sedge that is native to parts of south eastern Europe and northern Asia.

See also 
 List of Cyperus species

References 

pannonicus
Plants described in 1778
Flora of Albania
Flora of Austria
Flora of Bulgaria
Flora of China
Flora of the Czech Republic
Flora of Greece
Flora of Hungary
Flora of Mongolia
Flora of Kazakhstan
Flora of Romania
Flora of Turkey
Flora of Turkmenistan
Flora of Ukraine
Flora of Uzbekistan
Flora of Yugoslavia
Taxa named by Nikolaus Joseph von Jacquin